Judy Gold (born November 15, 1962) is an American stand-up comedian, actress, podcaster, television writer, author and producer. She won two Daytime Emmy Awards for her work as a writer and producer on The Rosie O'Donnell Show.

Life and career
She was born on November 15, 1962, in Newark, New Jersey. She first did stand-up on a dare when she was a music student at Rutgers University. She is a lesbian who shared a relationship with Sharon Callahan, her former partner, for almost 20 years. She has two children (Henry, 1996, and Ben, 2001), facts she frequently referenced on the show Tough Crowd with Colin Quinn. Gold is very active in both LGBT and Jewish communities. She was active in support of the 2004 and 2008 Democratic presidential campaign. In an interview with Marc Maron, Gold revealed her comedic influences to be Joan Rivers, Phyllis Diller, and Totie Fields.

Her one-woman show 25 Questions for a Jewish Mother, co-written with Kate Moira Ryan, is based on a series of interviews with more than 50 Jewish mothers in the United States. Their stories are interspersed with anecdotes about her own mother and her life as a lesbian mother of two sons. It ran at the Ars Nova Theater in New York City in early 2006 and reopened on October 12, 2006, at St. Luke's Theater. Judy Gold also appears as a commentator on truTV's TruTV Presents: World's Dumbest. In 2007, she was featured in the film Making Trouble, a tribute to female Jewish comedians, produced by the Jewish Women's Archive. In 2011, Gold was named a Givenik Ambassador. In 2015, she appeared off-Broadway as Eleanor Roosevelt in the satiric musical Clinton: The Musical at New World Stages.

The Judy Show: My Life as a Sitcom 
On June 30, 2011, The Judy Gold Show: My Life as a Sitcom, began previews at Off-Broadway's DR2 Theatre in New York City. This one-woman show is an homage to the classic sitcoms of Gold's youth. The show is written by Gold and Kate Moira Ryan and directed by Amanda Charlton.

The show officially opened on July 6, 2011, to positive reviews. The New York Times called the show "highly entertaining." The New York Post called the show "gleefully self-deprecating". The show subsequently opened in Los Angeles June 18, 2013, and had a one-month run at the Geffen Playhouse.

Kill Me Now podcast 
Judy Gold began the Kill Me Now with Judy Gold podcast in 2015.

Filmography

Film

Television

Web

References

External links 

25 Questions for a Jewish Mother
Voices on Antisemitism Interview with Judy Gold from the U.S. Holocaust Memorial Museum
All That Glitters

1962 births
20th-century American Jews
20th-century American actresses
20th-century American comedians
21st-century American Jews
21st-century American actresses
21st-century American comedians
Actresses from Newark, New Jersey
American lesbian actresses
American lesbian writers
American stand-up comedians
American women comedians
American women podcasters
American podcasters
Jewish American female comedians
Jewish activists
LGBT Jews
LGBT people from New Jersey
American LGBT rights activists
Lesbian comedians
Living people
New Jersey Democrats
American LGBT comedians